Louis Moore may refer to:

 Louis Moore (historian), American historian
 Louis T. Moore (1885–1961), preservationist, author, historian, photographer, and civic promoter